Adnan Hussain (born 6 December 1985) is a UAE international footballer who plays as a midfielder.

References 

1985 births
Living people
Emirati footballers
Association football midfielders
Baniyas Club players
Al Ahli Club (Dubai) players
Emirates Club players
Al-Wasl F.C. players
Al-Nasr SC (Dubai) players
Hatta Club players
Al Dhaid SC players
UAE First Division League players
UAE Pro League players
Emirati people of Baloch descent
Footballers at the 2006 Asian Games
Asian Games competitors for the United Arab Emirates